Olli Johan Oskari Mäki (22 December 1936 – 6 April 2019) was a Finnish boxer. As an amateur, he won the European lightweight title in 1959, having placed second in 1957. After being dropped from the 1960 Olympic team, he turned professional and fought until 1973 with a record of 28 victories, 14 losses and 8 draws. In August 1962 he was beaten in two rounds by Davey Moore for the World Featherweight Title, and in February 1964 he won the European Boxing Union light welterweight title against Conny Rudhof; he lost it to Rudhof in 1967. In retirement Mäki worked as a boxing coach and manager.

The 2016 film The Happiest Day in the Life of Olli Mäki is based on his life.

Mäki died after a long illness on 6 April 2019, aged 82. He had been suffering from dementia and Alzheimer's disease.

References

External links
 
 

Finnish male boxers
1936 births
2019 deaths
Deaths from Alzheimer's disease
Deaths from dementia in Finland
People from Kokkola
Featherweight boxers
Sportspeople from Central Ostrobothnia